The Tong is a river in Tong District of Issyk-Kul Region of Kyrgyzstan. It rises on north slopes of Teskey Ala-Too Range and flows into the Tong Bay of the lake Issyk-Kul. The river is used for irrigation. The river flows in vicinity of settlements Bökönbaev and Tört-Kül .

References

Rivers of Kyrgyzstan
Tributaries of Issyk-Kul